Jáchym Topol (born 4 August 1962) is a Czech poet, novelist, musician and journalist who became a laureate of the Czech State Award for Literature in October 2017 for his novel Sensitive Man.

Life 
Jáchym Topol was born in Prague, Czechoslovakia, to Josef Topol, Czech playwright, poet, and translator of Shakespeare, and Jiřina Topolová, daughter of the famous Czech Catholic writer Karel Schulz.

Topol's writing began with lyrics for the rock band Psí vojáci, led by his younger brother, Filip, in the late '70s and early '80s. In 1982, he cofounded the samizdat magazine Violit, and in 1985 Revolver Revue, a samizdat review that specialized in modern Czech writing.

Because of his father's dissident activities, Topol was not allowed to go to university. After graduating from gymnasium he worked as a stoker, stocker, construction worker, and coal deliveryman. Several times he was imprisoned for short periods, both for his samizdat publishing activities and for his smuggling across the Polish border in cooperation with members of Polish Solidarity. He was also a signatory of the Charter 77 human rights declaration.

During the 1989 Velvet Revolution in Czechoslovakia, Topol wrote for the independent newsletter Informační servis, which later became the investigative weekly Respekt. As of October 2009, he was on the staff of the daily Lidové noviny.

He lives in Prague with his wife, Barbara, and their two daughters, Josefína and Marie.

Works

Poetry 

 Miluju tě k zbláznění (I love you madly; samizdat, 1988) / Topol's first collection of poetry, published in samizdat, received the Tom Stoppard Prize for Unofficial Literature (founded in 1983 by Tom Stoppard and awarded by the Charta 77 Foundation in Stockholm); first non-samizdat edition published by Atlantis in 1990.
 V úterý bude válka (The war will be on Tuesday; Edice 13x18, 1992) / Five poems from this collection were published in Alex Zucker's translation in the Spring 1994 issue of Trafika: an international literary review.

Novels 

 Sestra (Sister; Atlantis, 1994) / Received the 1995 Cena Egona Hostovského (Egon Hostovský Prize), awarded for a "novel which artistically exceeds the standard production" / English translation Alex Zucker: City Sister Silver (Catbird Press, 2000) / Polish translation Leszek Engelking: Siostra (Wydawnictwo W.A.B., 2002) / Also translated into German and Hungarian
 Anděl (Angel; Hynek, 1995) / German translation Peter Sacher: Engel Exit (Volk und Welt, 1997) / French translation Marianna Canavaggio: Ange exit (J'ai lu, 2002) / Turkish translation Martin Alaçam: Andel (Norgunk, 2005) / Also translated into Hungarian
 Noční práce (Nightwork; Hynek, 2001) / French translation Marianna Canavaggio: Missions nocturnes (Laffont, 2002)  / Polish translation Leszek Engelking: Nocna praca (Wydawnictwo W.A.B., 2004)  / English translation Marek Tomin: Nightwork (Portobello Books, 2014) / Also translated into Croatian, Dutch, German, Italian, Spanish and Swedish
 Kloktat dehet (Gargling tar; Torst, 2005) / French translation Marianna Canavaggio: Zone cirque (Editions Noir Sur Blanc, 2009) / Polish translation Leszek Engelking: Strefa cyrkowa (Wydawnictwo W.A.B., 2008) / English translation David Short: Gargling with Tar (Portobello Books, 2010) / Also translated into Dutch, German, Italian, Norwegian.
 Chladnou zemí (Through a chilly land; Torst, 2009) / Received the 2010 Cena Jaroslava Seiferta / Swedish translation Tora Hedin: Kallt land (Ersatz, 2009)  / Dutch translation Edgar de Bruin: De werkplaats van de duivel (Anthos, 2010) / Italian translation Letizia Kostner: L'officina del diavolo (Zandonai, 2012)  / English translation Alex Zucker: The Devil's Workshop (Portobello Books, 2013)
 Citlivý člověk (Sensitive Man; Torst, 2017)

Novellas 

 Výlet k nádražní hale (Outing to the train station concourse; Edice Slza, 1994, limited edition of 350) / English translation Alex Zucker: A Trip to the Train Station (Petrov, 1995; Albatros Plus, 2011; Czech-English bilingual edition)

Short Stories and Plays 

 Zlatá hlava (Golden head; Torst, 2005)
 Supermarket sovětských hrdinů (Supermarket of Soviet heroes; Torst, 2007)
 Trochu Medu (A Little Honey), full text (The Short Story Project)

Literary Reports 

 Zabitý idol Václav Švéda (The murdered idol Václav Švéda; Respekt Special IV/2015) / English translation Anthony Bartos: Václav Švéda, the murdered idol (cardandcube, 2023)

Translations 

 Trnová dívka (Thorn girl; Hynek, 1997) / A collection of Native American legends and myths, selected and translated into Czech from English by Topol

Song Lyrics 

 Psí vojáci: Sestra: Jáchym Topol & Psí Vojáci (1994)
 Monika Načeva: Možnosti tu sou (There are possibilities here; 1994)
 Monika Načeva: Nebe je rudý (The sky is red; 1996)
 Monika Načeva: Mimoid (Weirdo; 1998)

Films 

 Anděl Exit (Angel Exit; 2000), directed by Vladimír Michálek; screenplay by Vladimír Michálek and Jáchym Topol.
 Sestra (Sister; 2008), directed by Vít Pancíř; screenplay by Vít Pancíř based on the novel by Jáchym Topol; music by Psí vojáci.

Other 

 Nemůžu se zastavit (I can't stand still; Portál, 2000) / A book-length interview with Topol by Tomáš Weiss

Awards and honours
1995 – Egon Hostovský Prize for City Sister Silver
2010 – Jaroslav Seifert Prize for The Devil's Workshop
2015 – Vilenica Prize
2017 – Czech State Award for Literature for Sensitive Man and for lifetime achievement

References

External links

 
 Jáchym Topol in Transcript: The European Internet Review of Books and Writing, no. 6: Czech Writing.
 Rob Trucks: A conversation with Jáchym Topol. Posted 28 July 2005. An interview with Jáchym Topol in five parts.
 Jáchym Topol in Transcript: The European Internet Review of Books and Writing, no. 22: Identity Revolutions. 
 Lyndsey Matthews: Journalism or Surrealism? Posted 16 October 2007. Jáchym Topol visits a journalism class.
 Blog for City Sister Silver with links to reviews.
 Jáchym Topol at Czechoslovak book network Baila.net

1962 births
Czech novelists
Czech male novelists
Czech poets
Czech male poets
Czech journalists
Writers from Prague
Journalists from Prague
Czech monarchists
Living people